Michał Czajkowski (29 September 180418 January 1886), also known in Turkey as Mehmet Sadyk Pasha, was a Polish writer and political émigré of distant Cossack heritage who worked both for the resurrection of Poland and also for the reestablishment of a Cossack state.

Early life
Michał Czajkowski was born in Halchyn (Halczyniec) to Stanisław Czajkowski and Petronela Głębocka, in a szlachta family settled in Ukraine for several generations. The Czajkowskis had origins in Czajki in Masovia, while the Głębockis were an old family from Kuyavia.  Through his mother he was a descendant of the Ukrainian Cossack Hetman Ivan Briukhovetsky (reigned 1663–68). Her family cultivated the memory of Głębocki who married the Hetman's granddaughter. Czajkowski was raised in the spirit of szlachta and Cossackdom. He participated in the Polish insurrection of 1830-31. After the failure of this uprising, he went into exile in France where he developed his ideology of the resurrection of Cossackdom and wrote several novels on this theme. Very popular at this time, some of them were translated into several languages including French and German. In general, in his early writings, Czajkowski saw no conflict between Polish and Cossack interests and romanticized the history of Ukrainian-Polish relations.

France and Turkey
During his French period, Czajkowski briefly collaborated with the radically oriented Polish Democratic Society, and then with the moderate Confederation of the Polish People, before going over to the conservative Polish emigre faction led by Prince Adam Jerzy Czartoryski called the "Hotel Lambert," after the Prince's residence in Paris. At Czartoryski's bidding, Czajkowski went to Turkey where he was active in Bosnia and Serbia and supported anti-Russian activities in the Caucasus. In the years following the unsuccessful revolutions of 1848, he helped arrange for political asylum for refugee Polish and Hungarian revolutionaries. Russian and Austrian efforts to have him extradited back to his homeland and conflicts with Paris led to his eventual conversion to Islam and his new name "Sadyk Pasha". He thereupon organized an Ottoman Cossack Brigade to fight against the Russians.  
Michał Czajkowski's Ottoman Cossack unit actually saw some action in the Balkans during the Crimean War but never got to invade Ukraine from the south which was the original intention of its organizers.

Return to Ukraine
Although Czajkowski returned from the war with honours and was able to live a comfortable life in Turkey, his restless nature could never be completely satisfied. His differences with the Hotel Lambert had steadily increased over the years and he was becoming more and more estranged from the Polish political emigration. He was also frustrated by the failure of his larger Cossack project. In 1872, the Russian government offered him an amnesty, and in part under the influence of his third wife, a young Greek girl, he accepted the Russian offer, converted to Orthodoxy, returned to Ukraine and chose to live in Kiev. During this period he wrote his very extensive memoirs. His young wife proved unfaithful, however, and in 1886 a dispirited Czajkowski took his own life.

Legacy
Czajkowski is remembered as a great Cossack enthusiast, a contemporary and friend of other prominent Polish romantics like the poet Adam Mickiewicz, and a leading member of the Ukrainian School of Polish literature. His writings had a profound influence upon younger generations of aristocratic Poles from right-bank Ukraine and boyhood reading of them probably influenced the future prominent historians, Volodymyr Antonovych and Vyacheslav Lypynsky to go over to the Ukrainian independence movement.

His son, Władysław Czajkowski, became an Ottoman official and served as governor in Mount-Lebanon.

Famous Works 
Powieści Kozackie (Cossack Tales, 1837) 
Wernyhora (1838)
Kirdzali (1839) 
Owruczanin (The Man from Ovruch, 1841)
Ukrainki (Ukrainian Women, 1841)

References

Further reading
 Thomas M. Prymak, "The Strange Life of Sadyk Pasha," Forum: A Ukrainian Review, no. 50 (1982), 28-31. A nicely illustrated article with a bibliography.

External links

Michal Czajkowski at the Encyclopedia of Ukraine

1804 births
1886 deaths
People from Zhytomyr Oblast
People from Zhitomirsky Uyezd
Polish male writers
Polish Cossacks
November Uprising participants
Polish expatriates in Turkey
Polish people of the Crimean War (Turkish side)
Activists of the Great Emigration
Ottoman Army generals
Pashas
Converts to Islam from Roman Catholicism
Converts to Eastern Orthodoxy from Islam
Eastern Orthodox Christians from Poland
Former Muslims
Ottoman military personnel of the Crimean War
Diplomats of the Hôtel Lambert
Ukrainian nobility
Suicides by firearm in Ukraine
Ottoman military personnel who committed suicide